Fan Ren is an American chemical engineer, focusing in wide energy bandgap electronic services and semiconductor device passivation, currently Fred and Bonnie Edie Professor, Distinguished Professor and UF Term Professor at University of Florida.

References 

University of Florida faculty
American chemical engineers
Living people
Year of birth missing (living people)
Place of birth missing (living people)
Fellows of the American Physical Society